Rumex rupestris, commonly known as shore dock, is a species of flowering plant belonging to the family Polygonaceae. Its native range is Western Europeand is one of the world's rarest dock species.

Description

R. rupestris is a coarse stout woody perennial measuring 30 – 50 cm (sometimes up to 70 cm) in height, with one or two shoots arising from the stock. The thick, dull bluish green leathery basal leaves are 10 – 30 cm long with entire, undulate leaf margins. They are oblong or broadly ovate-lanceolate shaped, narrowing rather abruptly to a truncate or subcordate base. The petiole is less than one third the length of the leaf blade. The stem leaves are oblong-lanceolate that gradually narrow to the base, with an acute leaf tip at the leaf end. The leaf margin is undulate, crenulate and subsessile.

The inflorescence comprises a dense panicle with ascending branches, usually making an angle of about 45 degrees with the main stem. The branches have numerous short crowded branchlets and 5 - 20  whorls of densely packed flowers.

The valves or tepals are blunt and entire, each measuring 3 – 4 x 2 – 2.5 mm. Each valve bears a very swollen smooth elongate tubercle that occupies over 2/3 of the valve length, and almost the entire width. These swollen tubercles are the critical feature distinguishing the species from similar species such as Rumex conglomeratus with considerably smaller tubercles. Vegetative identification of R. rupestris is difficult and needs confirming when the plant is in fruit (PlantLife).
The nut is reddish brown and trigonous, measuring about 2 x 1.5 mm and with acute angles. It is broadest near the rounded base and abruptly acute at the tip.

Distribution and habitat

R. rupestris is a European endemic restricted to small, scattered populations across the Atlantic coasts of western Europe. Its known distribution covers coastal areas of Anglesey, south Wales, south-western England, the Channel Islands, through France to Galicia and northern Spain. It is reported to be locally common on the Isles of Scilly.

Shore dock grows at or just above mean high-water mark in low-altitude (up to 60m) coastal habitats, always with a constant supply a freshwater and in the presence of bare ground created by coastal erosion. The habitats typically include damp cliff edges or bases, seepage zones and  wave-cut platforms. More rarely, the plant grows in dune slacks and on sand or shingle beaches, as well as bedrock crevices with a submerged supply of freshwater from springs. It does not appear to have specific soil requirements and can grow in soil-free fissures in sedimentary or metamorphic rocks, as well as fine blown sand and shingle.

Ecology

R.rupestris occurs in very small localized populations often comprising fewer than 10 individuals per site, growing either separately or in small clumps. Populations occupy small areas of suitable habitat usually covering less than 1m2 and rarely extending beyond a few square meters. Although this plant occurs only in very small, scattered colonies, these could be functioning as components of larger metapopulations in the wider landscape. The floating fruits are dispersed by sea wave action, which potentially enables the plant to colonize new areas along the coast (PlantLife). However, due to the dynamic nature of the coastal environment where it grows, R. rupestris individuals that do become newly established in a small area of suitable habitat may survive for only one or a few years before being eradicated. Nevertheless, individuals occasionally reappear in sites from which they previously disappeared. 

Rumex rupestris is a poorly competitive pioneer species favouring bare ground. It is susceptible to out-competition from other vigorous perennials such as Phragmites australis and Rubus fruticosus and is therefore dependent on regular coastal erosion and physical habitat disturbance for suppression of stronger competitors, thereby allowing sufficient recruitment to seedlings. The plant can also withstand grazing by cattle, sheep, and horses, and this may provide an ecological benefit by preventing  succession from open to closed vegetation.

Threats and human impacts

The plant appears to be vulnerable to human impacts throughout its entire range. Threats include tourism pressures, cliff consolidation, construction of coastal defense works such as seawalls, marine pollution from oil spillage, sewage or fertilizer run-off, and possibly increased storminess through climate change. Coastal protection measures can reduce population both through direct loss of plant colonies and reduced erosion of sites. Nevertheless, shore dock is also vulnerable to population loss through the natural instability of its habitat and relatively small population size as well as habitat encroachment of more vigorous perennials, especially through agrochemical run-offs.

Rarity and protection status

R. rupestris has been included on the Red List and is listed as endangered in the British Red Data Book. It is also protected under Schedule 8 of the Wildlife and Countryside Act 1981, as well as appearing in Annexes II and IV of the  European Community Directive on the Conservation of Natural Habitats & Wild Fauna & Flora 1992 and in Annex I of the  Bern Convention 1982.

This plant is listed as a priority species within the UK Biodiversity Action Plan and the Cornwall Local Biodiversity Plan. The first full species action plan for shore dock was prepared in 1999, most of which has since been executed by Plantlife, Natural England, the Centre for Ecology and Hydrology, the Countryside Council for Wales, and the National Trust. The ongoing activities ensure that localities with existing populations are monitored, new populations searched for, and the plant’s ecological requirements accounted for during land management, developmental control and coastal defense works.

Although it is a rare species, shore dock has a range of life history traits that make it highly adapted to a physically disturbed habitat and harsh set of environmental conditions. For example, it can easily withstand effects of salt from sea spray. However, the physical disturbance of the dynamic environment that allows the plant to persist through exclusion of stronger competitors also prevents significant recruitment from seedlings. This irony may explain the plant’s natural rarity.

References

rupestris